Blackall Simonds may refer to:

 William Blackall Simonds (1761–1834), a brewer and banker from Reading, England
 George Blackall Simonds (1843–1929), a sculptor and brewer from Reading, England

See also
 H & G Simonds Ltd
 Simonds (disambiguation)